Whitney Peak is a conspicuous peak (3,005 m) rising 3 nautical miles (6 km) northwest of Mount Hampton, from which it is separated by a distinctive ice-covered saddle, in the northernmost part of the Executive Committee Range, Marie Byrd Land, Antarctica. Mapped by United States Geological Survey (USGS) from surveys and U.S. Navy aerial photographs, 1958–60. Named by Advisory Committee on Antarctic Names (US-ACAN) for Captain Herbert Whitney, U.S. Navy Reserve, commander of the Navy's Mobile Construction Battalion responsible for the building of Antarctic stations for use during the International Geophysical Year. Whitney wintered over at Little America V in 1956.

Mountains of Marie Byrd Land
Executive Committee Range